Benjamin Franklin School may refer to:

in the United States
(by state then city)
Benjamin Franklin Public School Number 36, Indianapolis, Indiana, listed on the National Register of Historic Places (NRHP) in Center Township, Marion County
Benjamin Franklin High School (New Orleans, Louisiana)
Benjamin Franklin Academics Plus School, Philadelphia Pennsylvania, listed on the NRHP in Northeast Philadelphia
Benjamin Franklin High School (Philadelphia), Pennsylvania
Benjamin Franklin School, a middle school in Uniontown Area School District, Pennsylvania

See also
List of places named for Benjamin Franklin#Schools
Ben Franklin Academy, Atlanta, Georgia
Franklin Learning Center, Philadelphia, Pennsylvania
Franklin School (disambiguation)
Franklin High School (disambiguation)